Maria Gabriela Fonseca (born 1958) is a Portuguese politician. A member of the centre-right Social Democratic Party (PSD), Fonseca was elected to the Assembly of the Republic of Portugal in 2019 and re-elected in 2022, as a representative of the Braga constituency.

Early life and education
Maria Gabriela da Cunha Baptista Rodrigues da Fonseca was born on 5 June 1958. She obtained a degree in education from the University of Minho. She married António Benjamim Saraiva da Fonseca.

Career
Fonseca worked as a teacher. From 2005 until her election to the National Assembly she was also a member of the board of governors of the Vocational Education School of Alto Ave (EPAVE). She also served as a member of the board of directors of the Sindicato dos Professores da Zona Norte (SPZN), the teachers’ union for the north of the country.

Political career
Between 2005 and 2019 Fonseca was vice president of the municipality of Póvoa de Lanhoso in the Braga District. In the 2019 national election she was elected to the Assembly of the Republic on the PSD list for the Braga constituency. She was re-elected in the January 2022 election, being sixth on the PSD list for Braga, with the party winning eight seats in that constituency.

References

Living people
1958 births
Social Democratic Party (Portugal) politicians
Members of the Assembly of the Republic (Portugal)
Women members of the Assembly of the Republic (Portugal)
University of Minho alumni
People from Póvoa de Lanhoso